Events in the year 1848 in Mexico.

Incumbents 
 President – Pedro María de Anaya
 President – Manuel de la Peña y Peña
 President – José Joaquín de Herrera

Governors
 Aguascalientes: Felipe Cosio
 Chiapas: Manuel María Parada/Jerónimo Cardona/Ponciano Solórzano del Barco/Fernando Nicolás Maldonado
 Chihuahua: 
 Coahuila: Eduardo González Laso
 Durango:  
 Guanajuato: 
 Guerrero: 
 Jalisco: 
 State of Mexico:  
 Michoacán: 
 Nuevo León: José María Parás
 Oaxaca: 
 Puebla: 
 Querétaro: Francisco de Paula Mesa
 San Luis Potosí: 
 Sinaloa: 
 Sonora: 
 Tabasco: 
 Tamaulipas: Jesús de Cárdenas	 
 Veracruz: Manuel Gutiérrez Zamora/José de Emparán/Manuel Gutiérrez Zamora
 Yucatán: 
 Zacatecas:

Events

 January 6 – Mexican General Antonio Gaona and his son are captured at the Battle of (sic)Napoluca (Nopalucan).
 January 22  to February 14 – A failed Mexican siege of Siege of San José del Cabo
 February 2 – Mexican–American War: The Treaty of Guadalupe Hidalgo is signed, ending the war and ceding to the United States virtually all of what is today the southwest of that country.
 March 16 – Battle of Santa Cruz de Rosales in Chihuahua
 March 31 – Lt. Col. Henry S. Burton defeated Mexican forces in Baja California Sur
 May 30 – Treaty of Guadalupe Hidalgo with the United States
 Peralta massacre

Notable births
 January 26 – Justo Sierra (writer)

References

 
Years of the 19th century in Mexico